William R. Allen is the name of:

 William R. Allen (economist) (1924–2021), American economist, professor and author
 William Allen (Canadian politician) (1919–1985)
 William Allen (Montana politician) (1871–1953), American politician and businessman
 William Allen (Utah architect) (1849–1928)
 William Reginald Allen (English cricketer) (1893–1950)
 William Rodney Allen, American author and former professor of English